The Elektrėnai Power Plant or Lithuania Power Plant is an 1055 MW electrical generating station near Elektrėnai, Lithuania, about  west of Lithuania's capital, Vilnius.  It is operated by Lietuvos Elektrinė, a subsidiary of Lietuvos Energija.

The plant was built in stages between 1960 and 1972. The Strėva River was dammed to supply it with cooling water, creating the Elektrėnai Reservoir. As of 2008 the plant comprised eight units fired with natural gas, heavy fuel oil, and a bitumen-based fuel known as Orimulsion, imported from Venezuela. It was designed as a base load plant, and generated about 10 TWh per year until 1992. Its operations were then reduced to about 5% of its capacity, since it acted only as a reserve in the Lithuanian power system. In 2012 9th block had been opened.

After the shutdown of the Ignalina nuclear power plant in 2009, the plant became the primary source of Lithuania's electrical power. Since the plant does not meet European Union environmental guidelines, a number of improvement projects have been proposed. A flue-gas desulfurization project was completed in September 2008.  In December 2007, Economy Ministry Undersecretary Arturas Dainius announced that a new 400-MW combined cycle unit would be built at the site as well. The cost of the new unit was estimated at 252 million euros; 57% of the funding will be supplied by the European Union, 33% by the plant, and the remaining 10% by the National Ignalina Decommissioning Fund. In 2012 9th unit had been opened, which cost in total 377 million euros.

The plant also supplies district heating to the town of Elektrėnai, established in 1962 to support its workers.

An interesting feature is that two of the three chimneys of EPP serve also as electricity pylons.

Footnotes

References
 European Bank for Reconstruction and Development - Executive Summary of Environmental Impact Assessment - Environmental and Related Technical Upgrading of Lithuanian Power Plant

Natural gas-fired power stations in Lithuania
Oil-fired power stations in Lithuania
Buildings and structures in Elektrėnai
Power stations built in the Soviet Union